Giovanni "Gianni" Puggioni (born 19 March 1966) is a former Italian sprinter who specialized in the 200 metres.

Biography
Puggioni was born in Sassari, Sardinia, he won eleven medals at the International athletics competitions, five of these with national relays team. His personal best 200 metres time is 20.44 seconds, achieved at the 1997 Mediterranean Games in Bari. His personal best 100 metres time is 10.36 seconds, achieved in July 1995 in Cesenatico.

Achievements

National titles
Puggioni won seven national championships at individual senior level.
Italian Athletics Championships
100 m: 1995, 1996 (2)
200 m: 1990, 1997 (2)
Italian Indoor Athletics Championships
60 m: 1997 (1)
200 m: 1991 (2)

See also
 Italy national relay team
 Italy at the World Athletics Championships
 Italy at the Military World Games
 Italy at the European Cup

References

External links
 

1966 births
Living people
People from Sassari
Italian male sprinters
Athletics competitors of Fiamme Gialle
Athletes (track and field) at the 1996 Summer Olympics
Olympic athletes of Italy
World Athletics Championships medalists
Italian masters athletes
Sportspeople from Sardinia
World Athletics Championships athletes for Italy
Mediterranean Games gold medalists for Italy
Mediterranean Games medalists in athletics
Athletes (track and field) at the 1997 Mediterranean Games
Italian Athletics Championships winners